The 2007 Missouri Valley Conference men's soccer season was the 17th season of men's varsity soccer in the conference.

The 2007 Missouri Valley Conference Men's Soccer Tournament was hosted by Creighton and won by Bradley.

Teams

MVC Tournament

See also 

 Missouri Valley Conference
 Missouri Valley Conference men's soccer tournament
 2007 NCAA Division I men's soccer season
 2007 in American soccer

References 

Missouri Valley Conference
2007 NCAA Division I men's soccer season